Eco Fighters is an arcade game released by Capcom on the CPS-2 arcade system board in March 1994.  As suggested by both its titles, the game has an "eco-friendly" theme.

Gameplay 

The game is a horizontal shooter, where the player controls a ship with a rotating gun.

Development and release 

It was also developed by the same team from two Mega Man arcade titles, The Power Battle and The Power Fighters.

Capcom re-released Eco Fighters for the PlayStation 2 and Xbox in 2006 as part of the Capcom Classics Collection Vol. 2 and Capcom Classics Collection Reloaded for the PSP.  The game was also playable on the GameTap online service.

Reception

Notes

References

External links 

 Eco Fighters at GameFAQs
 Eco Fighters at Killer List of Videogames
 Eco Fighters at MobyGames

1994 video games
Arcade video games
Capcom games
CP System II games
Eco-terrorism in fiction
Horizontally scrolling shooters
Video games developed in Japan
Multiplayer and single-player video games